Alfred W. Harris was an American lawyer and legislator in Virginia. He served four two-year terms in the Virginia House of Delegates from 1881 until 1888.

Harris was born free in Fairfax County, Virginia, in 1854. He graduated from Howard University Law School in 1881. He practiced law in Petersburg, Virginia, and was elected to represent Dinwiddie County during the reconstruction era. As a legislator he pushed for the creation of Virginia Normal and Collegiate Institute (now Virginia State University).

See also
 African-American officeholders during and following the Reconstruction era

References 

People from Fairfax County, Virginia
1854 births
Date of death missing
Howard University School of Law alumni
Virginia lawyers
Members of the Virginia House of Delegates